Itasy is a region in central Madagascar. It borders Analamanga region in northeast, 
Vakinankaratra in south and Bongolava in northwest. The capital of the region is Miarinarivo, and the population was 897,962 in 2018.

Administrative divisions
Itasy Region is divided into three districts, which are sub-divided into 51 communes.

 Arivonimamo District - 22 communes
 Miarinarivo District - 12 communes
 Soavinandriana District - 15 communes

Infrastructure

Airport
Arivonimamo Airbase

Roads
The National road 1 and National road 43 cross this region.

Bodies of water
There are 58 rivers in Itasy.  21 rivers are flowing in Miarinarivo District, 17 rivers in Arivonimamo District and 20 in Soavinandriana District.
3500 ha are covered by lakes: 40 lakes in Miarinarivo, 9 lakes in Soavinandriana and 2 in Arivonimamo.

Lake Itasy
The region of Itasy is named after Lake Itasy, the fourth largest lake in Madagascar. The lake is in Ampefy, 120 km from the capital city of Antananarivo.

Tourism
According to the ONTM (Office National de Tourism de Madagascar), more 60% of domestic tourists from the capital city use this as their short-stay holiday destination each year. However, this still amounts to less than 200 tourists per day, or up to 1200 tourists per day on national holidays. Ampefy, by lake Itasy, is the main tourist town.

Tourist sights
The region is famous for several features:
 Lake Itasy, which is a source of livelihood for 3000 fisherman, with over 100 small canoes out daily;
 The monument of the Virgin Mary, on the edge of the lake, marking the very centre of the country;
 The isle of the Lake Itasy King, with a stone circle;
 The two Lily Waterfalls, of which the first is 16 m high by 35 m wide and the second over 22 m high, but not as wide;
 The Analavory Chute, which is over 20 m high;
 Over 20 small lakes;
 Boating and trekking experiences;
 The Analavory geysers, which are coldwater geysers that occasionally reach a height of nearly 3 m and have formed high travertine mounds;
 An ancient double-moated hillfort which can be seen near the town of Soavinandriana;
 Substantial numbers of huge extinct volcanic craters, some with crater lakes; and
 Lemurs' Park, which is seen at PK 22 (22 km) en route to Lake Itasy from the capital city.

Agriculture
Base of the economy is agriculture. Main crops and their size of cultivation (ha) are:
 Rice (66000 ha)
 Peanut (37279 ha)
 Maize (37279 ha)
 Manioc (22872 ha)
 Beans (12204 ha)
 Potatoes (9211 ha)
 Bambara groundnut (4836 ha)
 Tomatoes (4168 ha)
 Sweet potatoes (1377 ha) 
 Ananas (3135 ha)
 sugar cane (222ha)

There is also cattle breeding.   Itasy produces 2.7% of the zebu bread in Madagascar and 4,9 % of the porc that is raised in Madagascar.

See also

 Antananarivo Province

References

 
Regions of Madagascar